Verticordia roei, commonly known as Roe's featherflower is a flowering plant in the myrtle family, Myrtaceae and is endemic to the south-west of Western Australia. It is a shrub with narrow leaves and is often covered with masses of creamy-white coloured flowers in late spring.

Description

Flowering time is from October to November.

Taxonomy and naming
Verticordia roei was first formally described by Stephan Endlicher in 1838 and the description was published in Stirpium Australasicarum Herbarii Hugeliani Decades Tres. The type specimen was collected by John Septimus Roe. The specific epithet (roei) honours Roe, the first surveyor-general of Western Australia.

Alex George undertook a review of the genus Verticordia in 1991 and described two subspecies:

George placed this species in subgenus Verticordia, section Catocalypta along with V. inclusa, V. apecta, V. insignis, V. habrantha, V. lehmannii and V. pritzelii.

Distribution and habitat
This verticordia usually occurs in sandy soil, often with clay or loam over laterite. Subspecies roei is widespread and locally common in areas between Merredin, Boorabbin, Wickepin, Hyden and Lake Grace in the Avon Wheatbelt, Coolgardie, Esperance Plains and Mallee biogeographic regions. Subspecies meiogona has a smaller distribution near Dalwallinu and Mukinbudin in the Avon Wheatbelt and Coolgardie bioregions.

Conservation
Subspecies meiogona is classified as "Priority One" meaning that it is known from only one or a few locations which are potentially at risk. Subspecies roei is classified as "not threatened".

Use in horticulture
Subspecies roei has proven to be difficult to propagate and maintain in cultivation but more success has been achieved with subspecies meiogona. The latter subspecies has been grown from cuttings and by grafting onto Chamelaucium uncinatum rootstock.

References

roei
Rosids of Western Australia
Eudicots of Western Australia
Plants described in 1838